Lion Rampant was a tabletop game publishing company from 1987 to 1990. Jonathan Tweet and Mark Rein-Hagen founded the company, and Lisa Stevens joined as the editor. They published Ars Magica, a roleplaying game about wizards in the Middle Ages, plus support material for the game. In addition, they published Whimsy Cards, which introduced freeform dramatic elements to a roleplaying session. In 1990, Lion Rampant merged with White Wolf Publishing.

References

External links
 Index of Lion Rampant products at RPG.net.

Role-playing game publishing companies
1987 establishments in the United States
1990 disestablishments in the United States